Myer Upton "Whitey" Skoog (November 2, 1926 – April 4, 2019) was an American professional basketball player for the National Basketball Association's Minneapolis Lakers. He was born in Duluth, Minnesota.

A 5 ft 11 in (180 cm) and 180 lb (82 kg) guard, Skoog played collegiately at the University of Minnesota.  Following his All-America senior season, he was drafted as a territorial pick in the first round of the 1951 NBA draft by the Lakers.

The Lakers won three NBA Championships in his first three years in the league.  Skoog played in six seasons in the NBA before back injuries forced his retirement. Some credit Skoog with being the creator of the jump shot and one of the first players to use a jump shot in an organized game. Following his career in the NBA, Skoog became the men's basketball coach and golf coach at Gustavus Adolphus College.  He was inducted into the school's hall of fame in 1987.

Skoog resided in a skilled nursing facility in St. Peter, Minnesota in his later years. He died on April 4, 2019, at the age of 92.

References

External links
Career Statistics
Gustavus Athletic Hall of Fame

1926 births
2019 deaths
All-American college men's basketball players
American men's basketball coaches
American men's basketball players
American people of Swedish descent
Basketball coaches from Minnesota
Basketball players from Minnesota
College men's basketball head coaches in the United States
Minneapolis Lakers draft picks
Minneapolis Lakers players
Minnesota Golden Gophers men's basketball players
Point guards
Shooting guards
Sportspeople from Duluth, Minnesota